Velis is a surname. Notable people with the surname include:

Andrea Velis, American operatic tenor
John Velis, American politician
Peter A. Velis, American judge

Aircraft
Pipistrel Velis Electro, a Slovenian electric aircraft design

See also
Veliš (disambiguation), several locations in the Czech Republic